Elm Grove is an unincorporated community in Caldwell County, in the U.S. state of Texas. According to the Handbook of Texas, there were no population estimates made available for the community in 2000. It is located within the Greater Austin metropolitan area.

History
A post office was established at Elm Grove in 1874 and remained in operation until 1890. The community then had steam-powered sawmills and gristmills, three cotton gins, a church, and 150 inhabitants by the mid-1880s. Farmers in the area shipped cotton and produce. Most of Elm Grove was in ruins in the 1920s. A community center was established in 1853 and was used for community singing throughout the 1960s and was renovated in the 1980s. The improvement of roads and utilities in the community attracted new residents, in which a majority of them traveled to work in the nearby cities of Lockhart and Luling. It was marked on county highway maps in 2000, but no population estimates were available for the community.

Geography
Elm Grove stands approximately one mile southeast of the junction of Farm to Market Roads 86 and 158, as well as four miles northeast of McMahan in eastern Caldwell County.

Education
In 1875, the community became the focal point of a new county school district. It closed in the 1940s and students living in the community attended school in McMahan, Dale, and Lockhart. After it closed, it became a community center. Today, the community is served by the Lockhart Independent School District.

References

Unincorporated communities in Caldwell County, Texas
Unincorporated communities in Texas